This article compares a large number of programming languages by tabulating their data types, their expression, statement, and declaration syntax, and some common operating-system interfaces.


Conventions of this article 
The rest is literal code. Guillemets ( and ) enclose optional sections.  indicates a necessary (whitespace) indentation.

Note that the tables are not sorted lexicographically ascending by programming-language name by default, and that some programming languages have entries in some tables but not others.

Type identifiers

Integers 

  Commonly used for characters.
C99 and C++11 also define the  exact-width types in the stdint.h header. See C syntax#Integral types for more information.
  Perl 5 does not have distinct types. Integers, floating point numbers, strings, etc. are all considered "scalars".
  PHP has two arbitrary-precision libraries. The BCMath library just uses strings as datatype. The GMP library uses an internal "resource" type.
  ALGOL 68G's runtime option  can set precision for s to the required "number" significant digits. The standard constants  and  can be used to determine actual precision.
  COBOL allows the specification of a required precision and will automatically select an available type capable of representing the specified precision. "", for example, would require a signed variable of four decimal digits precision. If specified as a binary field, this would select a 16-bit signed type on most platforms.
  Smalltalk automatically chooses an appropriate representation for integral numbers. Typically, two representations are present, one for integers fitting the native word size minus any tag bit and one supporting arbitrary sized integers. Arithmetic operations support polymorphic arguments and return the result in the most appropriate compact representation.
  Ada range types are checked for boundary violations at run-time (as well as at compile-time for static expressions). Run-time boundary violations raise a "constraint error" exception. Ranges are not restricted to powers of two. Commonly predefined Integer subtypes are: Positive (range 1 .. Integer'Last) and Natural (range 0 .. Integer'Last). Runtime checks can be disabled if performance is more important than integrity checks.
  Ada modulo types implement modulo arithmetic in all operations, i.e. no range violations are possible. Modulos are not restricted to powers of two.
  Commonly used for characters like Java's char.
   in PHP has the same width as  type in C has on that system.
  Erlang is dynamically typed. The type identifiers are usually used to specify types of record fields and the argument and return types of functions.
  When it exceeds one word.

Floating point 

With the constants ,  and  available for each type's machine epsilon.
  declarations of single precision often are not honored
  ALGOL 68G's runtime option  can set precision for s to the required "number" significant digits. The standard constants  and  can be used to determine actual precision.
  These IEEE floating-point types will be introduced in the next COBOL standard.

Complex numbers 

  Generic type which can be instantiated with any base floating point type.

Other variable types 

  specifically, strings of arbitrary length and automatically managed.
  This language represents a boolean as an integer where false is represented as a value of zero and true by a non-zero value.
  All values evaluate to either true or false. Everything in  evaluates to true and everything in  evaluates to false.
 This language does not have a separate character type. Characters are represented as strings of length 1.
  Enumerations in this language are algebraic types with only nullary constructors

Derived types

Array 

 In most expressions (except the sizeof and  operators), values of array types in C are automatically converted to a pointer of its first argument. See C syntax#Arrays for further details of syntax and pointer operations.
  The C-like type x[] works in Java, however type[] x is the preferred form of array declaration.
  Subranges are used to define the bounds of the array.
  JavaScript's array are a special kind of object. 
  The  clause in COBOL does not create a true variable length array and will always allocate the maximum size of the array.

Other types 

  Only classes are supported.
  s in C++ are actually classes, but have default public visibility and are also POD objects. C++11 extended this further, to make classes act identically to POD objects in many more cases.
  pair only
  Although Perl doesn't have records, because Perl's type system allows different data types to be in an array, "hashes" (associative arrays) that don't have a variable index would effectively be the same as records.
  Enumerations in this language are algebraic types with only nullary constructors

Variable and constant declarations 

  Pascal has declaration blocks. See functions.
 Types are just regular objects, so you can just assign them.
  In Perl, the "my" keyword scopes the variable into the block.
  Technically, this does not declare name to be a mutable variable—in ML, all names can only be bound once; rather, it declares name to point to a "reference" data structure, which is a simple mutable cell.
  If no initial value is given, an invalid value is automatically assigned (which will trigger a run-time exception if it used before a valid value has been assigned). While this behaviour can be suppressed it is recommended in the interest of predictability. If no invalid value can be found for a type (for example in case of an unconstraint integer type), a valid, yet predictable value is chosen instead.
There is a "non-upper-case globals" error for non-uppercase  variables. After it is defined, a  variable can only be assigned to in an  block or function.

Control flow

Conditional statements 

  A single instruction can be written on the same line following the colon. Multiple instructions are grouped together in a block which starts on a newline (The indentation is required). The conditional expression syntax does not follow this rule.
  This is pattern matching and is similar to select case but not the same. It is usually used to deconstruct algebraic data types.
  In languages of the Pascal family, the semicolon is not part of the statement. It is a separator between statements, not a terminator.
  END-IF may be used instead of the period at the end.
  In Rust, the comma at the end of a match arm can be omitted after the last match arm, or after any match arm in which the expression is a block (ends in possibly empty matching brackets {}).

Loop statements 

  "step n" is used to change the loop interval. If "step" is omitted, then the loop interval is 1.
  This implements the universal quantifier ("for all" or "") as well as the existential quantifier ("there exists" or "").
  THRU may be used instead of THROUGH.
  «IS» GREATER «THAN» may be used instead of >.
  Type of set expression must implement trait std::iter::IntoIterator.

Exceptions 

Unhandled conditions may cause the implementation to show a restarts menu to the user before unwinding the stack.
  Uncaught exceptions are propagated to the innermost dynamically enclosing execution. Exceptions are not propagated across tasks (unless these tasks are currently synchronised in a rendezvous).

Other control flow statements 

  Pascal has declaration blocks. See functions.
  label must be a number between 1 and 99999.

Functions 

See reflection for calling and declaring functions by strings.

  Pascal requires "" for forward declarations.
  Eiffel allows the specification of an application's root class and feature.
  In Fortran, function/subroutine parameters are called arguments (since  is a language keyword); the  keyword is required for subroutines.
  Instead of using , a string variable may be used instead containing the same value.

Type conversions 

Where string is a signed decimal number:

  JavaScript only uses floating point numbers so there are some technicalities.
  Perl doesn't have separate types. Strings and numbers are interchangeable.
   is available to convert any type that has an implementation of the  trait. Both  and  return a  that contains the specified type if there is no error. The turbofish on  can be omitted if the type can be inferred from context.

Standard stream I/O 

  ALGOL 68 additionally as the "unformatted" transput routines: read, write, get, and put.
  gets(x) and fgets(x, length, stdin) read unformatted text from stdin. Use of gets is not recommended.
  puts(x) and fputs(x, stdout) write unformatted text to stdout.
  fputs(x, stderr) writes unformatted text to stderr
   are defined in the  module.

Reading command-line arguments 

  In Visual Basic, command-line arguments are not separated. Separating them requires a split function Split(string).
  The COBOL standard includes no means to access command-line arguments, but common compiler extensions to access them include defining parameters for the main program or using  statements.

Execution of commands 

 Fortran 2008 or newer.

References 

Programming constructs
Basic instructions